Helsa is a municipality and village in the district of Kassel, in Hesse, Germany. The municipality is situated in the Losse valley amongst the hills of the Kaufunger Wald, approx. 15 km east of Kassel.

Division of the municipality
The municipality consists of the villages,  Eschenstruth (including Settlement Waldhof), Helsa, St. Ottilien  and  Wickenrode.

References

External links
 Official site 

Kassel (district)